Ella Kovacs (born 11 December 1964) is a retired Romanian middle-distance runner of Hungarian descent who specialized in the 800 metres. She won World Championship bronze medals in 1991 and 1993, and won the European Indoor Championship title in 1985 and 1992. She also finished sixth in the 800m final at the 1992 Olympics. Her 800m best of 1:55.68, was the fastest time in the world in 1985, and ranks second to Doina  Melinte on the Romanian all-time list.

Achievements

References

Romanian sportspeople of Hungarian descent
People from Luduș
Romanian female middle-distance runners
1964 births
Living people
Athletes (track and field) at the 1992 Summer Olympics
Olympic athletes of Romania
World Athletics Championships medalists
Competitors at the 1994 Goodwill Games